Carlos Leonardo Morales Santos (born 4 November 1968) is a Paraguayan retired footballer who played mainly as an attacking midfielder.

Football career
Having started with local Club Guaraní in 1985, Morales played most of his career in Argentina, appearing for eight different clubs in that country (11 overall) and retiring in 2006 at the age of 38. He represented Paraguay at the 1998 FIFA World Cup, playing the first half of the 0–0 group stage draw against Bulgaria and gaining a total of seven caps in one year, since making his debut in 1997 (aged 29).

He is the older brother of another footballer – and midfielder – Argentine Ángel Matute Morales. Both played for Club Atlético Independiente, but in separate spells.

References

External links
 Argentine League statistics at Fútbol XXI 
 
 
 

1968 births
Living people
Paraguayan footballers
Association football midfielders
Club Guaraní players
Argentine Primera División players
Club Atlético Independiente footballers
Club de Gimnasia y Esgrima La Plata footballers
Newell's Old Boys footballers
Gimnasia y Esgrima de Jujuy footballers
Club Atlético Colón footballers
Racing de Córdoba footballers
San Martín de Tucumán footballers
Chilean Primera División players
Universidad de Chile footballers
Liga MX players
Paraguay international footballers
1998 FIFA World Cup players
Paraguayan expatriate footballers
Expatriate footballers in Argentina
Expatriate footballers in Chile
Expatriate footballers in Mexico
Paraguayan expatriate sportspeople in Argentina
Paraguayan expatriate sportspeople in Chile
Paraguayan expatriate sportspeople in Mexico